Shamakhy khanate was a feudal state on the modern territory of Azerbaijan in the 18th century. Diarchy existed in Shamakhy khanate. Part of the khanate was governed by Mahammad Hasan khan, other parts was governed by Mahammad Said and Agasi brothers. Mahammad Said khan unified Shamakhy khanate in 1763 and Shamakhy city became the centre of khanate. In 1767, Guba and Shaki khanates attacked the Shamakhy and territory of the khanate was divided between them. In 1790, Shirvan khans restored their authorities.

Rulers
 Haji Mahammadali Khan 1747-1763
 Mahammadsaid Khan, Agasi Khan 1748-1768
 Mustafa Khan 1792-1820

See also
 Khanates of the Caucasus

References

External links
 Realities of Azerbaijan 1917-1920
 Shamakhi. Image by Emanu Garnheim shamakhi
 Azerbaijan – places not to miss
 Khanates of Azerbaijan

18th century in Azerbaijan